Wallum, or wallum country, is an Australian ecosystem of coastal south-east Queensland, extending into north-eastern New South Wales.  It is characterised by flora-rich shrubland and heathland on deep, nutrient-poor, acidic, sandy soils, and regular wildfire.  Seasonal changes in the water table due to rainfall may create swamps.  The name is derived from the Kabi word for the wallum banksia (Banksia aemula).

Threats
Wallum, as with other coastal ecosystems, is highly threatened by the pressure for coastal development.  Threats include clearing of land for residential development and pine plantations, alterations to drainage from adjacent developments, nutrients from fertilizers, changes in fire frequency, pollution from mosquito control sprays, and the introduction of weeds.

Species endemic to wallum include some acid frogs – frogs adapted to living and breeding in acidic waters – such as the wallum froglet (Crinia tinnula), wallum rocket frog (Litoria freycineti), and the wallum sedge frog (Litoria olongburensis).  In Queensland, the eastern ground parrot appears to be largely restricted to the wallum.

References
 Coastal lowlands vegetation factsheet PDF downloaded 23 July 2007
 Wallum Worries - Gardening Australia factsheet PDF downloaded 23 July 2007

External links
 Coloola Coastcare – What’s Wallum?
 Wallum Heathland ecology

Eastern Australian temperate forests
Habitats